Karkuyeh (also Romanized as Karkūyeh, Karakūyeh, and Karekūyeh; also known as Kareh Kūyeh) is a village in Efzar Rural District, Efzar District, Qir and Karzin County, Fars Province, Iran. At the 2006 census, its population was 550, in 123 families.

References 

Populated places in Qir and Karzin County